Nicole Demars (born 17 August 1970) is a road cyclist from Canada. She represented her nation at the 2004 UCI Road World Championships.

References

External links
 profile at Procyclingstats.com

1970 births
Canadian female cyclists
Living people
Place of birth missing (living people)